William Robson (October 3, 1864 – )  was a Manitoba politician, and the leader of that province's Independent-Farmers in 1921 and 1922.

Life
Born in Scarborough, Yorkshire, England, Robson arrived in Canada with his parents at the age of two.  He worked as a farmer, and was a shareholder in the Grain Grower's Guide (a popular farmer's newspaper in Canada).  Robson served as both a councillor and reeve during the 1910s.

In 1920, Robson was one of 12 "farmer's candidates" elected to the legislature of Manitoba (he defeated future Liberal leader James Breakey in Glenwood, by four votes).  Robson was subsequently chosen as leader of the Independent-Farmers, which was the name chosen by the victorious candidates for their parliamentary caucus.

The Independent-Farmers were a diverse group, and did not continue beyond the dissolution of parliamentary in 1922.  Subsequently, the United Farmers of Manitoba would represent the province's farming community in a more organized way.

Robson did not run for re-election in 1922, and did not serve in the government of UFM Premier John Bracken.

References

1864 births
1941 deaths
Progressive Party of Manitoba MLAs